Cristina Conati is an Italian and Canadian computer scientist specializing in artificial intelligence and computer-human interaction. She is a professor of computer science at the University of British Columbia, and has served as president of the Association for the Advancement of Affective Computing.

Conati earned a master's degree in computer science from the University of Milan in 1988, and a Ph.D. from the University of Pittsburgh in 1999. Her dissertation, An intelligent computer tutor to guide self-explanation while learning from examples, was supervised by Kurt VanLehn. She joined the University of British Columbia faculty in 1999, and became a full professor there in 2016.

With Yukiko Nakano and Thomas Bader, Conati is an editor of the book Eye Gaze in Intelligent User Interfaces: Gaze-based Analyses, Models and Applications (Springer, 2013).

References

External links
Home page

Year of birth missing (living people)
Living people
Italian computer scientists
Canadian women computer scientists
Canadian computer scientists
Italian emigrants to Canada
University of Pittsburgh alumni
Academic staff of the University of British Columbia Faculty of Science